The Collegiate Church of the Immaculate Conception is a Roman Catholic parish church located in Cospicua, Malta.

History
The original parish church stood on the location of the present church. It was built before the Great Siege of Malta of 1565.  It became a parish in 1586. Because of the growing number of parishioners it was decided to enlarge the church. But by 1684 the church became too small thus the construction of the present church commenced. 

The designs of the church are attributed to Vincenzo Casanova while those of the bell towers are attributed to Lorenzo Gafà. The church was finished around 1730. In 1822 the church was elevated to the status of a collegiate church.

The dome includes paintings of David, Ezekiel, Moses and Isaiah by Giuseppe Calì from 1884.

The church building is listed on the National Inventory of the Cultural Property of the Maltese Islands.

See also

Culture of Malta
History of Malta
List of Churches in Malta
Religion in Malta

References

1586 establishments in Europe
Cospicua
Collegiate churches in Malta
National Inventory of the Cultural Property of the Maltese Islands
16th-century establishments in Malta
Roman Catholic churches completed in 1730
18th-century Roman Catholic church buildings in Malta